Michelle Yvonne Simmons,  (born 14 July 1967) is a Scientia Professor of Quantum Physics in the Faculty of Science at the University of New South Wales and has twice been an Australian Research Council Federation Fellow and is an Australian Research Council Laureate Fellow. She is the Director of the Australian Research Council Centre of Excellence for Quantum Computation & Communication Technology and is recognised internationally as the creator of the field of  atomic electronics. She was the inaugural editor-in-chief of npj Quantum Information, an academic journal publishing articles in the emerging field of quantum information science. On 25 January 2018, Simmons was named as the 2018 Australian of the Year for her work and dedication to quantum information science. On 10 June 2019, Simmons was appointed an Officer of the Order of Australia (AO) in the 2019 Queen's Birthday Honours in recognition of her "distinguished service to science education as a leader in quantum and atomic electronics and as a role model."

Education
Simmons went to Durham University (Trevelyan College), where she studied Physics and Chemistry of Materials (1985–1988).  As a postgraduate at St Aidan's College she was awarded a PhD on "The characterisation of CdTe-based epitaxial solar cell structures fabricated by MOVPE" in 1992 for research supervised by Andrew W. Brinkman.

Career and research
In the 1990s Simmons worked as a Research Fellow in quantum electronics with Professor Sir Michael Pepper at the Cavendish Laboratory in the UK where she gained an international reputation for her work in the discovery of the 0.7 feature and the development of 'hole' transistors. In 1999, she was awarded a QEII Fellowship and went to Australia, where she was a founding member of the Australian Research Council Centre of Excellence for Quantum Computer Technology. 
She made the Australia Day address for NSW in 2017 and spoke about the importance of setting high expectations for students. She made it clear that Australians need to set the bar high and tell their students they expect them to jump over it. She said, "It is better to do the things that have the greatest reward; things that are hard, not easy." Simmons also criticised the lowering of standards in physics education in the HSC (Higher School Certificate) curriculum, in which an effort has been made to make physics more appealing to girls by substituting mathematical problem-solving with qualitative responses, remarking that the curriculum had a "feminised nature".

When Simmons was made Australian of the Year in 2018, she spoke about the importance of not being defined by other people's expectations of you. She said, "Don't live your life according to what other people think. Go out there and do what you really want to do." She is passionate about encouraging girls to pursue a career in science and technology. “Seeing women in leadership roles and competing internationally is important. It gives them the sense that anything is possible,” she said.

Achievements 
Simmons is well-known for creating the field of atomic electronics. Since 2000 she has established a large research group dedicated to the fabrication of atomic scale devices in silicon and germanium using the atomic precision of scanning tunnelling microscopy. Her research group is the only group worldwide that can create atomically precise devices in silicon—they were also the first team in the world to develop a working "perfect" single-atom transistor and the narrowest conducting doped wires in silicon.

Simmons has published over 400 peer-reviewed journal papers amassing over 9,000 citations, written five book chapters and published a book on nanotechnology. She has also filed seven patents and delivered over 200 invited and plenary presentations at international conferences.

Honours and awards
Simmons is an elected trustee of Sydney Grammar School.

In 1999, she was awarded a QEII Fellowship and came to Australia.

In 2005,  Simmons was awarded the Australian Academy of Science's Pawsey Medal

In 2006, she became one of the youngest researchers to be elected a Fellow of the Australian Academy of Science (FAA).

In 2011, she was named NSW Scientist of the Year by the NSW Government Office of the Chief Scientist & Engineer.

In 2014, she was elected a member of the American Academy of Arts and Sciences.

In 2015, Simmons was awarded the Thomas Ranken Lyle Medal, and was the winner of the Eureka Prize for Leadership in Science. She was also elected a Fellow of the Australian Academy of Technological Sciences and Engineering (FTSE).

She was named the L'Oréal-UNESCO Awards for Women in Science Asia-Pacific Laureate in 2017 and was subsequently profiled in a short documentary on France24 TV.

In 2018, Simmons was named Australian of the Year in 2018 for her work in quantum physics, and elected a Fellow of the Royal Society (FRS).

In 2019, she was appointed an Officer of the Order of Australia (AO) as part of the 2019 Queen's Birthday Honours recognition.

She was New South Wales Scientist of the Year in 2011  and awarded the Royal Society of New South Wales Walter Burfitt Prize in 2013. The Australian Research Council made her a Laureate Fellow in 2013.

Simmons was awarded the Royal Society's 2022 Bakerian Medal and Lecture.

In 2021, Simmons  was named a Fellow of the American Physical Society.

Personal life 
Simmons has resided in Australia since 1999, taking citizenship in 2007. She is married to Thomas Barlow, a novelist and business analyst. They have three children.

References

1967 births
Living people
Australian physicists
Quantum physicists
Australian nanotechnologists
British nanotechnologists
Academic staff of the University of New South Wales
Fellows of the Australian Academy of Science
Fellows of the Royal Society of New South Wales
Fellows of the American Academy of Arts and Sciences
Australian women scientists
L'Oréal-UNESCO Awards for Women in Science laureates
21st-century British women scientists
Scientists of the Cavendish Laboratory
Australian of the Year Award winners
British emigrants to Australia
Fellows of the Australian Academy of Technological Sciences and Engineering
Fellows of the Royal Society
Female Fellows of the Royal Society
Australian Fellows of the Royal Society
Officers of the Order of Australia
Alumni of Trevelyan College, Durham
Alumni of St Aidan's College, Durham
Australian women academics
Fellows of the American Physical Society